Nawabzada Salahuddin Saeed Nawab of former princely State of Amb, is a Pakistani politician. He was elected to the National Assembly five times between 1985 and 1997 as an independent and candidate from different parties.

See also
 State of Amb
 State of Phulra
 Painda Khan Tanoli
 Nawab Khan Zaman Khan

References

Living people
Pakistan Muslim League (N) MNAs
Army Burn Hall College alumni
1958 births